is a type of Japanese yōkai. There is a depiction of this yōkai in Sekien Toriyama's collection of yōkai drawing the Konjaku Gazu Zoku Hyakki, and they can also be seen in the kibyōshi among other publications of the same era.

Classics
In the Konjaku Gazu Zoku Hyakki it wears a Japanese umbrella with its central pole missing, and it is depicted possessing a paper lantern. In the explanatory text, it says, "", stating that they are the jidō (children employed by the nobility) of the Chinese god of rain "Ushi".

Since  is an honorary title of the nobility (大人, "ushi"), and since  can be understood as  meaning "children", there is the interpretation that it is a yōkai depicted using a play on words "a child employed by an adult".

In the kibyōshi of the Edo period, just like the popular kibyōshi character tōfu-kozō, they appear as yōkai that take on the role of servants. In the kibyōshi "" by Jihinari Sakuragawa and illustrated by Utagawa Toyokuni published in Kansei 4 (1792), when a man walks on a rainy night, a one-eyed amefurikozō wearing a bamboo kasa would step up possessing something in both its hands. Since they appear on rainy nights, and since they possess something in both hands, there is the interpretation that they can be understood as tōfu-kozō who also appears on rainy nights possessing tōfu.

Modern
According to yōkai literature published after the Showa and Heisei eras, there are the theories that if you steal the umbrella from him and wear it, one would not be able to take it off, and the theory that they make it shower and delight at seeing people get troubled. According to the explanation at Mizuki Shigeru Road in Sakaiminato, Tottori Prefecture, the amefurikozō would be the one with the role of adjusting rain, something that is greatly related to the work and life of all living things.

In Norio Yamada's writing titled "Tōhoku Kaidan no Tabi", in the part titled "Amefurikozō", there is a story where at Sennin Pass in Kamihei District, Iwate Prefecture, a fox (kitsune) requested to an amefurikozō, "I shall be performing a fox's wedding (kitsune no yomeiri), so please make the rain fall," and when the kozō waved a paper lantern that it has making the rain suddenly fall, and during that time the fox's wedding was performed.

See also
List of legendary creatures from Japan

References

Yōkai